Italian X Rays is the thirteenth studio album by American rock band Steve Miller Band. The album was released in November 1984, by Capitol Records. "Who Do You Love?" and "Out of the Night" were songs co-written by Steve Miller and Tim Davis. Tim Davis had been a co-founder of the Steve Miller Band and had been a drummer, singer and songwriter with the band during its first five albums, released between 1968 and 1970. As of 1984, Davis was suffering from the effects of diabetes, and died four years later.

The album contained two minor hit singles, “Shangri-La” (No. 57 on the Billboard Hot 100) and, “Bongo Bongo” (No. 84 on the Billboard Hot 100). Music videos were also made to accompany both tracks.

Referring to "Out of the Night",  Steve Miller wrote, in the liner notes to the Steve Miller Band Box Set (1994), "This is the last song I wrote with Tim Davis. Tim was dying at the time from diabetes and it had taken a terrible toll on him. But he never lost his good humor."

Track listing

Personnel
 Steve Miller – vocals, guitar, Synclavier, keyboards
 Kenny Lee Lewis – bass guitar, guitar
 Byron Allred – keyboards
 Gary Mallaber – drums, percussion

References

1984 albums
Steve Miller Band albums
Capitol Records albums